Gilkerson's Union Giants were an independent Negro semi-pro baseball team headed by Robert Gilkerson in the 1920s and 1930s. The team was noted as having played in 1920 and 1930 to 1931.

Notable players
Ted "Double Duty Radcliffe"
John Donaldson
Pelayo Chacón
Dink Mothell
Clarence Coleman
Hurley McNair
Steel Arm Davis

References

Further reading
 Wisconsin Stories: Gilkerson's Union Giants

External links
 1920 Gilkerson Union Giants Calendar

Negro league baseball teams
Defunct baseball teams in Illinois
Baseball teams disestablished in 1931
Baseball teams established in 1920